David Hönigsberg (28 October 1959 – 3 February 2005) was a South African classical composer, conductor and musicologist.

Born in Johannesburg, South Africa, he lived in Switzerland since 1993 until his death.

At the age of 45, he died in Aarau.

External links
Classical composers database
Online resume

1959 births
2005 deaths
20th-century classical composers
21st-century classical composers
South African composers
South African male composers
People from Johannesburg
South African expatriates in Switzerland
South African conductors (music)
Male classical composers
People from Aarau
20th-century conductors (music)
20th-century male musicians
21st-century male musicians